Zernogradsky District is an administrative and municipal district (raion), one of the forty-three in Rostov Oblast, Russia. It is located in the south of the oblast. Its administrative center is the town of Zernograd. Population: 58,757 (2010 Census);  The population of Zernograd accounts for 45.7% of the district's total population.

References

Notes

Sources

Districts of Rostov Oblast